Georgine Leeka (September 6, 1929 – February 19, 2011) was an American beauty pageant titleholder.

Biography
She was crowned "Miss Oklahoma" in 1949 and represented her state in the Miss America 1949 Pageant.

She later married Clyde Jones, from Tennessee, and by 2011 had been living in Huntsville, Alabama, since 1961. They had five children, fourteen grandchildren, and four great grandchildren. They were members of the Central Church of Christ in Huntsville, where Mr. Jones served as an elder.

References

1929 births
2011 deaths
People from Huntsville, Alabama
Miss America 1940s delegates
20th-century American people